Warner House may refer to:

Places in the United States
(by state then city or town)

P. C. Warner First House, Florence, Arizona, listed on the National Register of Historic Places (NRHP) in Pinal County, Arizona
Solomon Warner House and Mill, Tucson, Arizona, listed on the NRHP in Pima County, Arizona
Capt. John T. Warner House, Batesville, Arkansas, listed on the NRHP in Independence County, Arkansas
Jonathan Warner House, Chester, Connecticut, also known as Warner-Brooks House, NRHP-listed
Warner House (East Haddam, Connecticut), NRHP-listed
Warner's Ranch, Warner Springs, California, NRHP-listed
J. W. Warner House, Miami, Florida, NRHP-listed
Peabody-Warner House, Columbus, Georgia, listed on the NRHP in Muscogee County, Georgia
Seth Warner House, Chicago, Illinois, listed on the NRHP in West Side Chicago
Warner Apartment Building, Davenport, Iowa, listed on the NRHP in Scott County, Iowa
Davis-Warner House, Takoma Park, Maryland, NRHP-listed
Timothy and Lucretia Jones Warner Homestead, Brighton, Michigan, listed on the NRHP in Livingston County, Michigan
Maj. William Warner House, Kansas City, Missouri, listed on the NRHP in Jackson County, Missouri
Warner-Cather House, Red Cloud, Nebraska, listed on the NRHP in Webster County, Nebraska
Warner's Filling Station and House, Geneva, Nebraska, listed on the NRHP in Fillmore County, Nebraska
MacPheadris–Warner House, Portsmouth, New Hampshire, known also as Warner House, a U.S. National Historic Landmark
Bute-Warner-Truax Farm, Charlotteville, New York, NRHP-listed
Oliver Warner Farmstead, Clifton Springs, New York, NRHP-listed
Asahel Warner House, Lima, New York, NRHP-listed
Matthew Warner House, Lima, New York, NRHP-listed
Vassar-Warner Row, Poughkeepsie, New York, NRHP-listed
H. H. Warner Building, Rochester, New York, NRHP-listed
Samuel Adams Warner House, Roslyn, New York, NRHP-listed
Isaiah Warner Farmstead, Wrightstown Township, Pennsylvania, listed on the NRHP in Bucks County, Pennsylvania
Orlando W. Warner House, Moab, Utah, listed on the NRHP in Grand County, Utah
Andrew J. Warner House, Ogden, Utah, listed on the NRHP in Weber County, Utah
Warner Home, St. Albans, Vermont, listed on the NRHP in Franklin County, Vermont
Warner Hall, Gloucester, Virginia, listed on the NRHP in Gloucester County, Virginia
Anson Warner Farmstead, Whitewater, Wisconsin, listed on the NRHP in Walworth County, Wisconsin

See also
Warner Theater (disambiguation)
Warner Valley Ranger Station, Chester, California, NRHP-listed